Redway may refer to:

 Redway (surname)
 Redway, California, United States, a census-designated place located in Humboldt County
 Redways, a network of shared-use paths in Milton Keynes, England

See also 
 Redway School (disambiguation)
 Redwater (disambiguation)